Francisco Caetano Monteiro de Assis also known as Kikas (born October 21, 1981) is an Angolan football player. He has played for Angola national team.

National team statistics

References

External links

1981 births
Living people
Angolan footballers
Angola international footballers
Association football defenders